The Battle of Angolpo took on 16 August 1592 two days after the Battle of Hansando. In two naval encounters, Korean Admiral Yi Sun-sin's fleet managed to destroy roughly 100 Japanese ships and halted Japanese naval operations along the southern coast.

Overview
News of the Japanese defeat at the Battle of Hansando reached Busan within hours and two Japanese commanders, Kuki Yoshitaka and Kato Yoshiaki, immediately set sail with 42 ships for the port of Angolpo, where they hoped to face the Korean fleet close to shore.

Yi Sun-sin received news of their movements on 16 August and he advanced towards Angolpo to confront them. This time the Japanese were unwilling to follow the Koreans into open water and stayed onshore. They would not take the bait. In response, the Korean fleet moved forwards and bombarded the anchored Japanese fleet for hours until they retreated inland. Later, the Japanese returned and escaped on small boats. Both Kuki Yoshitaka and Kato Yoshiaki survived the battle.

Aftermath
Won Gyun was left behind to mop up Japanese soldiers marooned on a small isle, but fled after receiving a false report of a large Japanese fleet approaching. The Japanese managed to drift to shore using rafts made from the wreckage of their ships.

On 23 August, Hideyoshi Toyotomi ordered naval commander Todo Takatora to reinforce operations in Korea and halted naval operations at Busan.

The battles of Hansan Island and Angolpo forced Hideyoshi to give a direct order to his naval commanders to cease all unnecessary naval operations and limit activity to the immediate area around Pusan Harbor. He told his commanders that he would come to Korea personally to lead the naval forces himself, but Hideyoshi was never able to carry through on this as his health was deteriorating rapidly. This meant that all the fighting would be in Korea, not China, and that Pyongyang would be the furthest northwestern advance of the Japanese armies (to be sure, Katō Kiyomasa's second contingent's brief march into Manchuria was Japan's northernmost advance, however, Manchuria was not a part of Imperial China in the 16th century). While Hideyoshi was unlikely to be able to invade China and conquer a large part of it, the battles of Hansan Island and Angolpo checked his supply routes and hindered his movements in Korea. Hideyoshi's larger war plans, supported in much written documentation, was nearly identical to Imperial Japan's blueprint for conquest in the 20th century.

References

Bibliography

See also
The Four Campaigns of Admiral Yi during the Imjin Year (1592)
Siege of Jinju (1592)
Battle of Haengju
Battle of Myeongnyang
Battle of Hansando

1592 in Asia
1592 in Japan
Conflicts in 1592

Naval battles of the Japanese invasions of Korea (1592–1598)
Yi Sun-sin